Francisco Maciel García (born 7 January 1964) is a former tennis player from Mexico. He represented his native country as a qualifier at the 1992 Summer Olympics in Barcelona, where he was defeated in the first round by Switzerland's Jakob Hlasek. He won the silver medal at the 1984 Summer Olympics, when tennis was a demonstration sport. The right-hander reached his highest singles ATP-ranking in June 1986, when he became world No. 35.

Career finals

Singles (1 loss)

References

External links

 
 

1964 births
Living people
Mexican male tennis players
Tennis players at the 1984 Summer Olympics
Tennis players at the 1988 Summer Olympics
Tennis players at the 1992 Summer Olympics
Olympic tennis players of Mexico
Sportspeople from Querétaro City
Central American and Caribbean Games medalists in tennis
Central American and Caribbean Games gold medalists for Mexico
Central American and Caribbean Games bronze medalists for Mexico
20th-century Mexican people